Jan Erik Fredrik Dahlgren (born 19 February 1947) is a retired Swedish high jumper. He competed at the 1966, 1969 and 1971 European championships and at the 1972 Summer Olympics, and finished in 10–14th place; he also placed fourth at the 1972 European Athletics Indoor Championships. Domestically Dahlgren won the Swedish title in 1971 and 1972 and set four national records, the last being 2.22 m in 1972.

References

1947 births
Living people
Swedish male high jumpers
Olympic athletes of Sweden
Athletes (track and field) at the 1972 Summer Olympics
Athletes from Stockholm
20th-century Swedish people